The Yukon River is a major watercourse of northwestern North America. From its source in British Columbia, Canada, it flows through Canada's territory of Yukon (itself named after the river). The lower half of the river continues westward through the U.S. state of Alaska. The total area is more than 25% larger than Texas or Alberta.

The longest river in Alaska and Yukon, it was one of the principal means of transportation during the 1896–1903 Klondike Gold Rush. A portion of the river in Yukon—"The Thirty Mile" section, from Lake Laberge to the Teslin River—is a national heritage river and a unit of Klondike Gold Rush International Historical Park. Paddle-wheel riverboats continued to ply the river until the 1950s, when the Klondike Highway was completed. After the purchase of Alaska by the United States in 1867, the Alaska Commercial Company acquired the assets of the Russian-American Company and constructed several posts at various locations on the Yukon River.

The Yukon River has a recent history of pollution from military installations, dumps, wastewater, and other sources. However, the Environmental Protection Agency does not list the Yukon River among its impaired watersheds, and water-quality data from the U.S. Geological Survey shows relatively good levels of turbidity, metals, and dissolved oxygen.  The Yukon and Mackenzie rivers have much higher suspended sediment concentrations than the great Siberian Arctic rivers.

The Yukon River Inter-Tribal Watershed Council, a cooperative effort of 70 First Nations and tribes in Alaska and Canada, has the goal of making the river and its tributaries safe to drink from again by supplementing and scrutinizing government data.

Name
The name Yukon, or ųųg han, is a contraction of the words in the Gwich'in phrase chųų gąįį han, which means white water river and refers to "the pale colour" of glacial runoff in the Yukon River.  The contraction is Ųųg Han, if the /ųų/ remains nasalized, or Yuk Han, if there is no vowel nasalization.  In the 1840s, different tribes had different opinions as to the literal meaning of Yukon.  In 1843, the Holikachuks had told the Russian-American Company that their name for the river was Yukkhana and that this name meant big river.  However, Yukkhana does not literally correspond to a Holikachuk phrase that means big river.  Then, two years later, the Gwich'ins told the Hudson's Bay Company that their name for the river was Yukon and that the name meant white water river.  White water river in fact corresponds to Gwich'in words that can be shortened to form Yukon.  Because the Holikachuks had been trading regularly with both the Gwich’ins and the Yup'iks, the Holikachuks were in a position to borrow the Gwich'in contraction and to conflate its meaning with the meaning of Kuig-pak [River-big], which is the Yup'ik name for the same river.  For that reason, the documentary evidence suggests that the Holikachuks had borrowed the contraction Ųųg Han [White Water River] from Gwich'in, and erroneously assumed that this contraction had the same literal meaning as the corresponding Yup'ik name Kuig-pak [River-big].

The Lewes River is the former name of the upper course of the Yukon, from Marsh Lake to the confluence of the Pelly River at Fort Selkirk.

The following table lists the Indigenous names for the Yukon.

Course

The generally accepted source of the Yukon River is the Llewellyn Glacier at the southern end of Atlin Lake in British Columbia. Others suggest that the source is Lake Lindeman at the northern end of the Chilkoot Trail. Either way, Atlin Lake flows into Tagish Lake (via the Atlin River), as eventually does Lake Lindeman after flowing into Bennett Lake. Tagish Lake then flows into Marsh Lake (via the Tagish River). The Yukon River proper starts at the northern end of Marsh Lake, just south of Whitehorse. Some argue that the source of the Yukon River should really be Teslin Lake and the Teslin River, which has a larger flow when it reaches the Yukon at Hootalinqua. The upper end of the Yukon River was originally known as the Lewes River until it was established that it actually was the Yukon. North of Whitehorse, the Yukon River widens into Lake Laberge, made famous by Robert W. Service's "The Cremation of Sam McGee". Other large lakes that are part of the Yukon River system include Kusawa Lake (into the Takhini River) and Kluane Lake (into the Kluane and then White River).

The river passes through the communities of Whitehorse, Carmacks, (just before the Five Finger Rapids) and Dawson City in Yukon, and crossing Alaska into Eagle, Circle, Fort Yukon, Stevens Village, Rampart, Tanana, Ruby, Galena, Nulato, Grayling, Holy Cross, Russian Mission, Marshall, Pilot Station, St. Marys (which is accessible from the Yukon at Pitkas Point), and Mountain Village. After Mountain Village, the main Yukon channel frays into many channels, sprawling across the delta. There are a number of communities after the "head of passes," as the channel division is called locally: Nunum Iqua, Alakanuk, Emmonak, and Kotlik. Of those delta communities, Emmonak is the largest with roughly 760 people in the 2000 census. Emmonak's gravel airstrip is the regional hub for flights.

Hazards

Navigational obstacles on the Yukon River are the Five Finger Rapids and Rink Rapids downstream from Carmacks.

Bridges
Despite its length, there are only four vehicle-carrying bridges across the river, listed from upstream to downstream:
 The Lewes Bridge, north of Marsh Lake, Yukon, on the Alaska Highway;
 The Robert Campbell Bridge, which connects the Whitehorse suburb of Riverdale to the downtown area;
 The Yukon River Bridge in Carmacks, Yukon, on the Klondike Highway; and
 The Yukon River Bridge, north of Fairbanks, Alaska on the Dalton Highway.

A car ferry crosses the river at Dawson City in the summer; it is replaced by an ice bridge over the frozen river during the winter. Plans to build a permanent bridge were announced in March 2004, although they are currently on hold because bids came in much higher than budgeted.

There are also two pedestrian-only bridges in Whitehorse, as well as a dam across the river and a hydroelectric generating station. The construction of the dam flooded the White Horse Rapids, which gave the city its name, and created Schwatka Lake.

Transportation is also performed along the river in summer by barge, enabling heavy goods, oil, and vehicles to be transported to communities along the Yukon, Tanana, Innoko, and Koyukuk rivers. This service is performed by Ruby Marine and reaches Tanana on the Yukon River and Nenana on the Tanana River.

Geography and ecology
Some of the upper slopes of this watershed (e.g. Nulato Hills) are forested by Black Spruce. This locale near the Seward Peninsula represents the near westernmost limit of the Black Spruce, Picea mariana, one of the most widespread conifers in northern North America.

The river flows into several parklands and refuges including:

 Innoko National Wildlife Refuge
 Nowitna National Wildlife Refuge
 Yukon-Charley Rivers National Preserve
 Yukon Delta National Wildlife Refuge
 Yukon Flats National Wildlife Refuge

Discharge

Yukon at Pilot Station (121 miles upstream of mouth) minimum, average and maximum discharge

Fisheries
The Yukon River is home to one of the longest salmon runs in the world. Each year Chinook, coho, and chum salmon return to their terminal streams in Alaska, the Yukon Territory, and British Columbia. The Chinook have the longest journey, with an estimated 35–50% bound for Canada. As salmon do not eat during their spawning migration, Yukon River salmon must have great reserves of fat and energy to fuel their thousands-mile-long journey. As a result, Yukon River salmon are noted for their especially rich and oily meat.

The villages along the Yukon have historically relied on and continue to rely on salmon for their cultural, subsistence, and commercial needs. Salmon are traditionally dried, smoked, and frozen for both human and sled dog consumption. Common methods of fishing on the Yukon include set gillnets, drift nets, dip nets, and fish wheels. The preference of certain gear is largely dependent on the river's varied characteristics in different areas. Some parts of the river do not have eddies to make set-nets successful, whereas in other places the tributaries are small enough to make drifting impractical.

Over the last 20 years salmon recruitment, the number of returning adults, has taken several shocks. The late 1980s, 1990s, and 2000s have been marked by radically reduced runs for various salmon species. The United States Department of Commerce issued a Federal Disaster Declaration for the 2008 and 2009 Commercial Chinook Yukon River fisheries, calling for the complete closure of commercial fishing along with restrictions on subsistence fishing. The root cause of these poor returns remains debated, with questions about the effects of climate change on ocean food-supply & disease prevalence in returning adults, the methods of fishing used on the river, and the effects of the Bering Sea Pollock trawl fleet on food supply and salmon bycatch.

Various organizations are involved to protect healthy salmon runs into the future. The Yukon River Drainage Fisheries Association was formed in 1990 by a consensus of fishers representing the entire drainage in response to recent disaster years. Its organizational goals include giving voice to the village fishers that have traditionally managed these resources, enabling communication between fishers and fishery managers, and helping to preserve the ecological integrity of salmon runs and local cultures' Traditional Ecological Knowledge

In March 2001, the U.S. & Canadian governments passed the Yukon River Salmon Agreement to better manage an internationally shared resource and ensure that more Canadian-originated salmon return across the border. The agreement is implemented through the Yukon River Panel, an international body of 12 members, equal-parts American and Canadian, that advises managers of Yukon River fisheries concerning restoration, conservation, and coordinated management.

Tribal organizations such as the Association of Village Council Presidents (AVCP), Council of Athabascan Tribal Governments (CATG), and Tanana Chiefs Conference (TCC) work to sustain Yukon River salmon to promote healthy people, cultures, and communities.

Tributaries

Yukon Territory

 Takhini River
 Big Salmon River
 Little Salmon River (Yukon)
 Nordenskiold River
 Teslin River
 Pelly River
 Macmillan River
 Stewart River
 Nadaleen River
 Lansing River
 Hess River
 Mayo River
 McQuesten River
 White River
 Donjek River
 Kluane River
 Nisling River
 Beaver Creek
 Sixtymile River
 Indian River
 Klondike River
 Fortymile River

Alaska
 Tatonduk River
 Seventymile River
 Nation River
 Kandik River
 Charley River
 Porcupine River
 (tributaries in the Yukon)
 Miner tributaries
 Fishing Branch
 Bell River
 Eagle River
 Rock River (Yukon)
 Driftwood River (Yukon)
 Old Crow River
 Bluefish River
 (tributaries in Alaska)
 Coleen River
 Black River
 Wood River
 Bear Mountain Creek
 Mountain Creek
 Chandalar Creek
 Sheenjek River
 Sheenjek River East Fork
 Koness River
 Eskimo Creek
 Christian River
 Chandalar River
 East Fork Chandalar River
 Junjik River
 Wind River
 Middle Fork Chandalar River
 North Fork Chandalar River
 West Fork Chandalar River
 Marten Creek
 Birch Creek
 Hadweenzic River
 Beaver Creek
 Hodzana River
 Dall River
 Ray River
 Big Salt River
 Hess Creek
 Garnet Creek
 Fish Creek
 Texas Creek
 Coal Creek
 Tanana River
 Nabesna River
 Chisana River
 Tetlin River
 Goodpaster River
 Delta River
 Salcha River
 Chena River
 Wood River
 Nenana River
 Tolovana River
 Kantishna River
 NC Creek
 Tozitna River
 Bluebell Creek
 Dagislakhna Creek
 Banddana Creek
 Blind River
 Bering Creek
 Nowitna River
 Sulatna River
 Big Creek
 Beaver Creek
 Glacier Creek
 Melozitna River
 Black Sand Creek
 Little Melozitna River
 Ruby Slough
 Yuki River
 East Fork Yuki River
 Kala Creek
 Kelly Creek
 Galena Creek
 Bishop Creek

 Koyukuk River
 Workyard Creek
 Gisasa River
 Kateel River
 Dulbi River
 Huslia River
 Nulitna River
 Tom Cook Slough
 Billy Hawk Creek
 Cutoff Slough
 Hogatza River
 Clear Creek
 Batza River
 Matthews Slough
 Little Indian River
 Indian River
 Calamity Creek
 Pocahontas Creek
 Kanuti River
 Discovery Creek
 Alatna River
 Siruk Creek
 South Fork Koyokouk River
 Jim River
 Jane Creek
 John River
 North Fork Koyukuk River
 Nulato River
 Khotol River
 Anvik River
 Bonasila River
 Stuyahok River
 Innoko River
 Paimiut Slough
 Reindeer River
 Iditarod River
 Yetna River
 First Chance Creek
 Mud River
 Dishna River
 Coffee Creek
 Tolstoi Creek
 Madison Creek
 Mastodon Creek
 Hurst Creek
 Taft Creek
 Finland Creek
 Scandinavian Creek
 North Fork Innoko River
 Tango Creek
 West Fork North Fork Innoko River
 Colorado Creek
 Kako Creek
 Engineer Creek
 Reindeer River
 Atchuelinguk River
 Andreafsky River
 Kashunuk River (distributary)

List of major tributaries

The main river and tributaries are (sorted in order from the mouth heading upstream):

In media 

 The Yukon River features as the setting for the 2015 National Geographic Channel series Yukon River Run.
 The industrial metal band Lindemann wrote a song named "Yukon" on their first album Skills in Pills.

See also
 Alaska salmon fishery
 List of longest rivers of Canada
 List of longest rivers of the United States (by main stem)
 List of rivers of Alaska
 List of Yukon rivers
 Steamboats of the Yukon River

References

External links

 Arctic Great Rivers Observatory
 Canadian Council for Geographic Education page with a series of articles on the history of the Yukon River 
 The Yukon River Bridge at Dawson City
 Yukon River Inter-Tribal Watershed Council
 Yukon River Drainage Fisheries Association
 Yukon River Panel

 
Drainage basins of the Bering Sea
Canadian Heritage Rivers
International rivers of North America
Rivers of Southeast Fairbanks Census Area, Alaska
Rivers of Kusilvak Census Area, Alaska
Rivers of Yukon–Koyukuk Census Area, Alaska
Rivers of Alaska
Rivers of Yukon
Rivers of British Columbia
Rivers of Unorganized Borough, Alaska
Braided rivers in Alaska